The Kitchen Tapes, released by ROIR in 1983, is the only live album by the Raincoats. The album features a recording of a December 1982 performance in New York City. It was originally released on cassette only, but was reissued in 1995 and 1998 on CD.

Track listing
All tracks composed by The Raincoats; except where indicated
"No One's Little Girl"
"Balloonacy"
"Oh Oh La La La"
"Only Loved at Night"
"I Saw a Hill"
"Mouth of a Story"
"The Body"
"Shouting Out Loud"
"Rainstorm"
"Dance of Hopping Mad"
"Animal Rhapsody"
"Puberty Song" (Traditional)
"No Side to Fall In"
"Honey Mad Woman"

Personnel
Vicki Aspinall - vocals, piano, violin
Gina Birch - vocals, bass, guitar
Ana da Silva - vocals, guitar, percussion
Richard Dudanski - drums, percussion
Paddy O'Connell - bass, guitar, saxophone
Derek Goddard - drums, percussion
Technical
Michael Whittaker - live mix/recording sound engineer
Greil Marcus - liner notes

References

The Raincoats albums
1983 live albums
ROIR live albums